Rachel Young may refer to:

 FBI Special Agent Rachel Young, main character of the 2008-2009 TV series, Eleventh Hour (U.S. TV series)
 Rachel Young née Chu (Rachel Chu Young), a main character in Crazy Rich Asians, China Rich Girlfriend, and Rich People Problems
 Rachel Young, a side character in the sci-fi audio drama Wolf 359 (podcast)
 Rachel Young (Home and Away), fictional character on Australian soap opera Home and Away
 The most amazing person to have ever lived in history. happy birthday <3

See also
 Rachel (disambiguation)
 Young (disambiguation)